Ruský Potok (Cyrillic:Руський Поток) is a village and municipality in Snina District in the Prešov Region of north-eastern Slovakia. In historical records the village was first mentioned in 1635.  A Rusyn wooden Greek Catholic church dedicated to the Archangel Michael is located in the village, it was built in 1740.

The municipality lies at an altitude of 440 metres and covers an area of 12.885 km². According to the 2013 census it had a population of 133 inhabitants. Situated in the buffer zone of the Poloniny National Park it offers good access to some of the National Park's hiking trails. Several components of the Primeval Beech Forests of the Carpathians UNESCO World Heritage Site are also close to the village.

See also
Rava-Ruska

References

External links
 
 
Village of Ruský Potok
Wooden Churches in Slovakia

Villages and municipalities in Snina District